Alec Worcester (1887–1952) was a British stage and silent film actor. He played the lead role opposite Alma Taylor in The Cloister and the Hearth and was the lead in fifty shorts. He was married to the actress Violet Hopson until their divorce in 1919.

Selected filmography
 Shadows of a Great City (1913)
 Kissing Cup (1913)
 The Cloister and the Hearth (1913)
 Justice (1914)

References

Bibliography
 Goble, Alan. The Complete Index to Literary Sources in Film. Walter de Gruyter, 1999.

External links

1887 births
1952 deaths
20th-century British male actors
English male film actors
English male silent film actors
20th-century English male actors
English male stage actors
Male actors from London
People from Brockley